The Heritage of Cebu Monument, also known as the Parian Monument, is a monument in Cebu City, Philippines. It was made by Filipino sculptor Eduardo Castrillo and architects Heradio Español and Ildefonso Santos. It is the centerpiece of the Parian Park which was the site of the Saint John the Baptist Church which was demolished in 1875 by the Diocese of Cebu.

The artwork is a tableau depicting several of Cebu's involvement in Philippine history including the Battle of Mactan, inauguration of Sergio Osmeña as President of the Philippines, and the canonization of Pedro Calungsod as saint by the Roman Catholic Church. It consist of a mixture of concrete, bronze, brass and steel sculptures.

References

Buildings and structures in Cebu City
Monuments and memorials in the Philippines